Derailer may refer to: 
 A railroad derail, also called a derailer, used to prevent fouling of a railroad track 
 Derailleur gears, a variable-ratio transmission system commonly used on bicycles